Hovea stricta is a flowering plant in the family Fabaceae and is endemic to the south-west of Western Australia. It is a small, upright shrub with mostly purple flowers, green needle-shaped leaves and flowering occurs in winter and spring.

Description
The stems are needle-shaped, partly spikey and hairy, branchlets thickly covered with hairs.

Taxonomy
Hovea stricta was first formally described in 1844 by the botanist Carl Meisner and the description was published in the Leguminosae section of Lehmann's work Plantae Preissianae. The specific epithet (stricta) means "erect".

Distribution and habitat
This hovea occurs on low hills, breakaways and flat plains along the coastal areas of the South West, Peel and Wheatbelt regions of Western Australia where it grows in sandy lateritic soils, heath and sand plains.

References

stricta
Rosids of Western Australia
Plants described in 1844